Motorman may refer to:

Motorman (rail transportation), a rail vehicle operator
Motorman (ship), a member of a ship's engine department responsible for maintaining the ship's systems
Motorman (drilling), a member of an offshore drilling crew responsible for engines on an oil rig
Motorman, a 1972 novel by David Ohle

See also
Operation Motorman, a military operation in 1972 by the British Army in Northern Ireland
Operation Motorman (ICO investigation), a 2003 investigation into data use by the British press